

Summary
Following publication of full track cycling quotas - 25 April 2012.

Although in theory an NOC is entitled to qualify up to one place per track event for a total of eighteen quota places, a limit of 14 riders (8 men, 6 women ) is placed on  each NOC, with the possibility of drafting in two further riders from other cycling events. For certain countries, therefore, the number of quota places won will significantly exceed the numbers of riders qualified.

Similarly, the cyclists who compete in the road time trial must also compete in the road race event; thus an NOC may win 2 quota places, but be allowed to take only one rider.

Legend
TS — Team Sprint
KE — Keirin
SP — Sprint
TP — Team Pursuit
OM — Omnium
RR — Road Race
TT — Individual Time Trial
Q — Quotas
R — Riders

Qualification timeline
The following is a timeline of the qualification events for the cycling events at the 2012 Summer Olympics.

Track cycling
Qualification is entirely based on the Olympic Track Ranking 2010–2012. NOCs are limited to one rider or team per event, 9 men / 7 women in total. Within these limits, riders who have qualified in one cycling event will have the right to enter others.

Men's Team Sprint
Teams are of 3 riders

Men's Sprint

Men's Keirin

Men's Team Pursuit
Teams are of 4 riders

Men's Omnium

Women's Team Sprint
Teams are of 2 riders

Women's Sprint

Women's Keirin

Women's Team Pursuit
Teams are of 3 riders

Women's Omnium

Road cycling

Men's road race

* Quota reduced to the number of riders in the ranking of the respective tour

** Quota reduced by one to accommodate for the individual qualifiers on the same tour

*** Additional quota places earned on the continental tour for countries with quota reduction due to lack of ranked riders on the world tour

Men's Individual Time Trial

Women's Road Race

* As other quota places are awarded to ranked athletes, the quota places for the ranked NOCs will be decreased to keep the total number of athletes constant.

**If, among the riders occupying the qualification places,  there are athletes representing an NOC already qualified according to criterion n°1, it is the NOC whose rider who is ranked in the next place in the competition concerned who will benefit from the right to participate.

Women's Individual Time Trial

Mountain biking
A nation can enter a maximum of 3 men and 2 women.

Men

Women

* Norway used only 1 spot.

BMX

Men

Women

References

Qualification for the 2012 Summer Olympics
Cycling qualification for the Summer Olympics